MidWestOne Financial Group, Inc. is a bank holding company headquartered in Iowa City, Iowa. The bank operates 57 branches. It is the 3rd largest bank headquartered in Iowa. It operates in Iowa, Minnesota, Wisconsin, Colorado, and Florida.

History
The subsidiary bank was formed in 1934 as the Iowa State Bank & Trust Company in Iowa City, Iowa by Ben S. Summerwill.

In 1983, ISB Financial Corp. was established as a closely held bank holding company for Iowa State Bank & Trust Company.

In March 2008, ISB Financial Corp. merged with MidWestOne Financial Group, Inc. and took MidWestOne Financial Group, Inc. as the name of the company.

In April 2011, then-chairman W. Richard Summerwill retired.

In May 2015, the bank acquired Central Bancshares of Golden Valley, Minnesota for $134 million in cash and stock.

In 2017, the bank opened its first branch in Denver, Colorado.

In June 2018, Barry S. Ray was hired as the Chief Financial Officer.

In November 2022, Charles N. Reeves was hired as the Chief Executive Officer.

References

Banks based in Iowa
American companies established in 1983
Banks established in 1983
Companies listed on the Nasdaq
1983 establishments in Iowa